Moreton-on-Lugg railway station was a station in Moreton-on-Lugg, Herefordshire, England. The station was opened in 1853, closed to passengers in 1958 and closed completely in 1964.

References

Further reading

Disused railway stations in Herefordshire
Railway stations in Great Britain opened in 1853
Railway stations in Great Britain closed in 1958
Former Shrewsbury and Hereford Railway stations